Antima Teerpu is a 1988 Indian Telugu-language film directed by Joshiy. It was a remake of the director's own Malayalam film, New Delhi, which was loosely based on the novel, The Almighty, written by Irving Wallace. It is the only Telugu film to be entirely shot in Delhi. Krishnam Raju won the Filmfare Award for Best Actor – Telugu for this film.

Synopsis 
The film revolves around a journalist, who is on a mission to end the menace of anti-social elements in the society.

Cast 
Krishnamraju as GK aka G. Krishna Moorti
Suresh Gopi as Suresh
Thiagarajan as Nataraj Vishnu aka Salem Vishnu
Sumalatha as Vasanta
Prabhakar Reddy as Party President Govind Chowdhary
Ranganath as Home Minister Shankar
Urvashi as Uma
Mohan Jose
Gummadi as Jailor

References

External links 
 

1988 films
Films scored by Shyam (composer)
1980s action drama films
Indian action drama films
Films directed by Joshiy
Telugu remakes of Malayalam films
Films about journalists
Journalism adapted into films
Films about the mass media in India
Indian prison films
Films set in prison
Films set in Delhi
Films shot in Delhi
1980s Telugu-language films